The outer enamel epithelium, also known as the external enamel epithelium, is a layer of cuboidal cells located on the periphery of the enamel organ in a developing tooth.  This layer is first seen during the bell stage.

The rim of the enamel organ where the outer and inner enamel epithelium join is called the cervical loop.

References
Cate, A.R. Ten. Oral Histology: development, structure, and function. 5th ed. 1998. .
Ross, Michael H., Gordon I. Kaye, and Wojciech Pawlina. Histology: a text and atlas. 4th edition. 2003. .

Tooth development